Love It to Life is the fifth studio album by Jesse Malin. It features a collective of players and friends called "The St. Marks Social". The first single from the album will be 'Burning the Bowery'. The album was released on April 27, 2010.

On two of the tracks ("The Archer" and "Disco Ghetto") Malin's best friend Ryan Adams played electric guitar and sang backing vocals.

Track listing
 "Burning the Bowery"
 "All the way from Moscow"
 "The Archer"
 "St. Mark's Sunset"
 "Lowlife in a High Rise"
 "Disco Ghetto"
 "Burn the Bridge"
 "Revelations"
 "Black Boombox"
 "Lonely at Heart"

References

External links
Official site of Jesse Malin

2010 albums
Jesse Malin albums
SideOneDummy Records albums